Yen's algorithm computes single-source K-shortest loopless paths for a graph with non-negative edge cost.  The algorithm was published by Jin Y. Yen in 1971 and employs any shortest path algorithm to find the best path, then proceeds to find K − 1 deviations of the best path.

Algorithm

Terminology and notation

Description
The algorithm can be broken down into two parts, determining the first k-shortest path, and then determining all other k-shortest paths. It is assumed that the container  will hold the k-shortest path, whereas the container , will hold the potential k-shortest paths. To determine , the shortest path from the source to the sink, any efficient shortest path algorithm can be used.

The  iteration can be divided into two processes, finding all the deviations  and choosing a minimum length path to become .

Next, the spur path, is found by computing the shortest path from the spur node, node , to the sink. Next, the edges that were removed, i.e. had their cost set to infinity, are restored to their initial values.

This path is removed from container  and inserted into container  and the algorithm continues to the next iteration.

Pseudocode
The algorithm assumes that the Dijkstra algorithm is used to find the shortest path between two nodes, but any shortest path algorithm can be used in its place.

 function YenKSP(Graph, source, sink, K):
     // Determine the shortest path from the source to the sink.
     A[0] = Dijkstra(Graph, source, sink);
     // Initialize the set to store the potential kth shortest path.
     B = [];
     
     for k from 1 to K:
         // The spur node ranges from the first node to the next to last node in the previous k-shortest path.
         for i from 0 to size(A[k − 1]) − 2:
             
             // Spur node is retrieved from the previous k-shortest path, k − 1.
             spurNode = A[k-1].node(i);
             // The sequence of nodes from the source to the spur node of the previous k-shortest path.
             rootPath = A[k-1].nodes(0, i);
             
             for each path p in A:
                 if rootPath == p.nodes(0, i):
                     // Remove the links that are part of the previous shortest paths which share the same root path.
                     remove p.edge(i,i + 1) from Graph;
             
             for each node rootPathNode in rootPath except spurNode:
                 remove rootPathNode from Graph;
             
             // Calculate the spur path from the spur node to the sink.
             // Consider also checking if any spurPath found
             spurPath = Dijkstra(Graph, spurNode, sink);
             
             // Entire path is made up of the root path and spur path.
             totalPath = rootPath + spurPath;
             // Add the potential k-shortest path to the heap.
             if (totalPath not in B):
                 B.append(totalPath);
             
             // Add back the edges and nodes that were removed from the graph.
             restore edges to Graph;
             restore nodes in rootPath to Graph;
                     
         if B is empty:
             // This handles the case of there being no spur paths, or no spur paths left.
             // This could happen if the spur paths have already been exhausted (added to A), 
             // or there are no spur paths at all - such as when both the source and sink vertices 
             // lie along a "dead end".
             break;
         // Sort the potential k-shortest paths by cost.
         B.sort();
         // Add the lowest cost path becomes the k-shortest path.
         A[k] = B[0];
         // In fact we should rather use shift since we are removing the first element
         B.pop();
     
     return A;

Example

This path is appended to container  and becomes the first k-shortest path, .

Node  of  becomes the spur node with a root path of itself, . The edge, is removed because it coincides with the root path and a path in container .

The edge, is removed because it coincides with the root path and a path in container .

Node  of  becomes the spur node with a root path, . The edge, is removed because it coincides with the root path and a path in container .

Of the three paths in container B,  is chosen to become  because it has the lowest cost of 7. This process is continued to the 3rd k-shortest path. However, within this 3rd iteration, note that some spur paths do not exist.

Features

Space complexity
To store the edges of the graph, the shortest path list , and the potential shortest path list ,  memory addresses are required. At worse case, the every node in the graph has an edge to every other node in the graph, thus  addresses are needed. Only  addresses are need for both list  and  because at most only  paths will be stored, where it is possible for each path to have  nodes.

Time complexity
The time complexity of Yen's algorithm is dependent on the shortest path algorithm used in the computation of the spur paths, so the Dijkstra algorithm is assumed. Since Yen's algorithm makes  calls to the Dijkstra in computing the spur paths, where  is the length of spur paths.
, the time complexity becomes .

Improvements
Yen's algorithm can be improved by using a heap to store , the set of potential k''-shortest paths. Using a heap instead of a list will improve the performance of the algorithm, but not the complexity.  One method to slightly decrease complexity is to skip the nodes where there are non-existent spur paths. This case is produced when all the spur paths from a spur node have been used in the previous . Also, if container  has  paths of minimum length, in reference to those in container , then they can be extract and inserted into container  since no shorter paths will be found.

Lawler's modification
Eugene Lawler proposed a modification to Yen's algorithm in which duplicates path are not calculated as opposed to the original algorithm where they are calculated and then discarded when they are found to be duplicates. Any spur path,  where , that is calculated will be a duplicate because they have already been calculated during the  iteration.

See also
 Yen's improvement to the Bellman–Ford algorithm

References

External links
 Open Source C++ Implementation
 Open Source C++ Implementation using Boost Graph Library

Graph algorithms
Polynomial-time problems
Articles with example pseudocode